A land disposal unit, or LDU, is a site in which hazardous waste is remedied through natural and man-made processes.
"Land disposal" of hazardous waste is defined in the U.S. Resource Conservation and Recovery Act (RCRA). Types of LDUs for hazardous waste disposal:
 Landfill
 Surface impoundment
 Waste pile
 Land treatment unit
 Injection well
 Salt dome formation
 Salt bed formation
 Mine
 Cave.

References

 Land disposal unit
Waste legislation in the United States
Waste treatment technology